The Sidewinders are an American football team located in the Nishinomiya, Hyogo, Japan.  They are a member of the X-League X2 division.

Team history
1970 Team founded by former Kyoto University players and staff.
1988 New sponsorship with the Iwatani International Corporation. Team renamed the Iwatani Sidewinders. 
1990 Join the X-League
1998 Finished 4th in the West division (1 win, 4 losses)
2003 Finished 6th in the West division (0 wins, 5 losses). Lost X2-X1 replacement match against the Finies Football Club. Demoted to X2 for the following season.
2004 Finished 1st in X2 West division (5 wins, 0 losses). Won X2-X1 promotion match against the Hankyu Bruins 24-15. Promoted to X1 for the following season.
2006 Finished 6th in the West division (1 win, 4 losses). Lost X1-X2 replacement match against the Nagoya Cyclones) 0-7. Demoted to X2 for the following season. 
2007 Iwatani International Corporation ends team sponsorship. Team renamed the Sidewinders.
2009 Finished 5th in the X2 West division (1 win, 4 losses). Lost X2-X3 against N.A.C.L. Demoted to X3 for the following season.
2010 Finished 1st in the X3 West division. Won X3-X2 promotion match against N.A.C.L. Promoted to X2 for the following season. 
2015 Finished 1st in the X2 West division (5 wins, 0 losses). Won X2-X1 promotion match against the Fuji Xerox J-Stars 17-10. Promoted to X1 for the following season.

Seasons

References

External links
  (Japanese)

American football in Japan
1970 establishments in Japan
American football teams established in 1970
X-League teams